"Real Hitta" is a song by American rapper Plies featuring American rapper Kodak Black. It was released on May 6, 2017 as the lead single from their collaborative mixtape F.E.M.A. (2017). It was produced by Bizness Boi and Th3ory.

Background
According to Kodak Black's engineer Derek Garcia, "Real Hitta" was recorded for Black's album Painting Pictures, but was not included in the final version.

Composition
The song sees the rappers wondering if their lovers have ever been in love with a thug before. It contains a sung hook by Kodak Black. Plies raps about selling drugs in a Trump Hotel, as well as what he can spend money on for his girlfriend.

Critical reception
Peter A. Berry of XXL favorably compared the song to Plies' 2007 song "Shawty", of which he stated that "Real Hitta" is "pretty much the exact opposite" for the reason that it features "rugged, but effortlessly emotive vocals from the Project Baby instead of T-Pain's glossy Auto-Tune."

Music video
The music video was released in June 2017. It features appearances from an old man with tattooed forearms and hoop earrings who imitates Kodak Black and mouths the lyrics, a bikini-clad model, a man in dreadlocks, a man in the military, "bouncing women", a couple in love and a "sorority redhead". The old man, known online as OG Magnum, is also seen holding a cigarette and a plastic cup, and hanging out beside a muscle car surrounded by two dancing young women. Plies and Kodak Black do not appear in the video.

Charts

References

2017 singles
2017 songs
Plies (rapper) songs
Kodak Black songs
Songs written by Plies (rapper)
Songs written by Kodak Black